Regulating synaptic membrane exocytosis 3 is a protein that in humans is encoded by the RIMS3 gene.

References

Further reading